K. Satyanarayana may refer to:

 Kaikala Satyanarayana (born 1935), Telugu film actor
 Koccharlakota Satyanarayana (1915–1969), Telugu film and stage actor
 K. Satyanarayana (academic), Indian scholar, editor and anti-caste activist